The EFL League One play-offs are a series of play-off matches contested by the association football teams finishing from third to sixth in the EFL League One table and are part of the English Football League play-offs. , the play-offs comprise two semi-finals, where the team finishing third plays the team finishing sixth, and the team finishing fourth plays the team finishing fifth, each conducted as a two-legged tie. The winners of the semi-finals progress to the final which is contested at Wembley Stadium.

For the first three years, the play-off final took place over two legs, played at both side's grounds. Swindon Town won the first League One play-off final in 1987, requiring a replay to defeat Gillingham. From 1990, the play-off final was a one-off match, hosted at the original Wembley Stadium, while from 2001 to 2006, the final was played at the Millennium Stadium in Cardiff as Wembley was being rebuilt. Since 2007, the match has been hosted at Wembley Stadium except for the 2011 final which took place at Old Trafford to avoid a clash with the 2011 UEFA Champions League Final.

When the third tier play-offs were first contested in 1987, they were known as the Football League Third Division play-offs. From 1993 to 2004, following the creation of the FA Premier League as a breakaway from the Football League, the competition became known as the Second Division play-offs, and since 2005 has taken its current name as the League One play-offs following a rebranding of the remaining three divisions of the Football League.

Format

, the League One play-offs involve the four teams that finish directly below the automatic promotion places in EFL League One, the third tier of the English football league system. These teams meet in a series of play-off matches to determine the final team that will be promoted to the EFL Championship.  The team finishing in third place plays the sixth-placed team in a two-legged tie, while the team in fourth plays the fifth-placed team over two legs, referred to as the "play-off semi-finals".  The first match of the semi-finals is played at the side with the lower league position's home ground while the second match takes place at the higher-ranking side's ground.  According to the EFL, "this is designed to give the highest finishing team an advantage".

The winner of each semi-final is determined by the aggregate score across the two legs, with the number of goals scored in each match of the tie being added together.  The team with the higher aggregate score qualifies for the final.  If, at the end of regular 90 minutes of the second leg, the aggregate score is level then the match goes into extra time where two 15-minute halves are played. If the score remains level at the end of extra time, the tie is decided by a penalty shootout.  The away goals rule does not apply in the play-off semi-finals.

As of 2022 there will be VAR (virtual assistance referee) used in the play off final against Wycombe wanderers and Sunderland FC.

The clubs that win the semi-finals then meet at Wembley Stadium, a neutral venue, for a one-off match referred to as the "play-off final".  If required, extra time and a penalty shootout can be employed in the same manner as for the semi-finals to determine the winner.  The runner-up and losing semi-finalists remain in League One while the winning side are promoted.  The match, along with the finals of the Championship and League Two play-offs, usually takes place over the long weekend of the second bank holiday in May.

Background

The mid-1980s saw a decline in attendances at football matches and public disenchantment with English football.  A number of instances of violence and tragedy struck the game. In March 1985 at the semi-final of the 1984–85 Football League Cup between Chelsea and Sunderland where more than 100 people were arrested after various invasions of the Stamford Bridge pitch and more than 40 people, including 20 policemen, were injured. Nine days later, violence flared at the FA Cup match between Millwall and Luton Town: seats were used as missiles against the police and resulted in Luton Town banning away supporters.  On 11 May, 56 people were killed and 265 injured in the Bradford City stadium fire and less than three weeks later, 39 supporters died and more than 600 were injured in the Heysel Stadium disaster where Liverpool were playing Juventus in the European Cup final.

In an attempt to persuade fans to return to the stadia, the Football League had rejected a £19million television deal to broadcast matches live on the BBC and ITV before the 1985–86 Football League season with League president Jack Dunnett suggesting that "football is prepared to have a year or two with no television".  In December 1985, the "Heathrow Agreement" was agreed which aimed to revitalise the financial affairs of the league.  It was a ten-point plan which included a structural reorganisation of the league, reducing the top tier from 22 clubs to 20, and the introduction of play-offs to facilitate the change.  The play-offs were introduced to the end of the 1986–87 Football League season.  They were initially introduced for two years but with the proviso that if they were successful with the general public, they would be retained permanently.

History
In the first two seasons, the team one place above the relegation zone in the Second Division, along with the three clubs below the automatic promotion positions in the Third Division, took part in the play-offs. In the inaugural play-offs, Second Division Sunderland were eliminated in the semi-finals by Third Division side Gillingham and suffered relegation to the third tier of English football for the first time in their history.  In the final, Gillingham faced Second Division Swindon Town but they could not be separated over the two home-and-away legs, so the tie was settled in a replay.  Played at a neutral ground, Crystal Palace's stadium Selhurst Park in Croydon, Swindon Town won the game 2–0 to gain promotion to the First Division, while Gillingham remained in the Second Division.  A replay was also required the following season when Walsall and Bristol City ended their two-legged final 3–3 on aggregate.  A penalty shootout was used to determine which side would host the replay, which Walsall won.  Played at Fellows Park two days after the second leg took place there, the match ended 4–0 to Walsall who were promoted.

The primary objective of the play-offs was achieved within the first two seasons, namely the reorganisation of the four leagues with 20 clubs in the first tier and 24 in the second to fourth tiers.  However, the popularity of the play-offs was such that the post-season games were retained and the play-offs were the first to feature four teams from the Third Division: Port Vale defeated Bristol Rovers over two legs in the 1989 Football League Third Division play-off final.  From 1990, the format of the final changed to a single match played at a neutral venue, initially the original Wembley Stadium.  The first winners of the inaugural one-off final were Notts County who beat Tranmere Rovers 2–0 in front of 29,252 spectators.

Wembley underwent renovations early in the 21st century and the 2000 final was the last to be hosted at the original stadium.  Subsequently, the finals were hosted at the Millennium Stadium in Cardiff, where Walsall needed extra time to beat Reading 3–2 in the final watched by a crowd of 50,496.  The Millennium Stadium held the finals until 2007 when the match was moved to the renovated Wembley Stadium, the first such final seeing Blackpool defeat Yeovil Town 2–0.

The game was relocated to Manchester United's ground, Old Trafford, for a single season as a result of a scheduling clash with the 2011 UEFA Champions League Final.  The most recent final, in 2020, was held behind closed doors as a result of the COVID-19 pandemic in the United Kingdom: Fulham defeated Brentford 2–1 after extra time in front of an official attendance of 0.

Since the first play-off final, the third tier of English football's league itself has undergone a number of re-brands.  In 1993, the Premier League was formed, a move which caused the third-tier league to be renamed as the Second Division.  In 2004, the Second Division was re-branded as Football League One, before the League's adoption of English Football League (EFL) led to a 2016 renaming as the EFL League One.

Prize
The financial value of winning the EFL League One play-off is derived from the additional remuneration clubs receive in the Championship.   clubs in the third tier receive around £1.4million, comprising a "basic award" and a "solidarity" payment, the latter of which is funded by the Premier League.  In the second tier, the total funding rises to a total of around £7million, a fivefold increase in revenue.  The winners of the final receive a trophy.

Winners and semi-finalists

Records
Seven clubs have secured promotion from the third tier of English football through the play-off final twice, Walsall becoming the first to do so in 2001 and most recently Blackpool who beat Lincoln City in the 2021 final.  Brentford have failed to be promoted via the play-offs on seven occasions.  Along with Bristol City, they have lost in the final three times.

Notes

References

Bibliography

Play-Offs
League One